"Then He Kissed Me" is a song written by Phil Spector, Ellie Greenwich and Jeff Barry. The song, produced by Spector, was initially released as a single on Philles Records (#115) in July 1963 by The Crystals. The lyrics are a narrative of a young woman's encounter, romance, and eventual engagement with a young man. 

In 2004, this song was number 493 on Rolling Stone magazine's list of 500 Greatest Songs of All Time.  Pitchfork placed it at number 18 on its list of "The 200 Greatest Songs of the 1960s". Billboard named the song number 8 on their list of 100 Greatest Girl Group Songs of All Time.

The song appears in the 1987 movie Adventures in Babysitting and in the 1990 movie Goodfellas.

The Crystals version
The single is one of The Crystals' best-remembered songs. It was recorded at Gold Star Studios in Los Angeles in April 1963. The lead vocal was sung by Dolores "LaLa" Brooks, the Wall of Sound arrangement was by Jack Nitzsche, featuring The Wrecking Crew, and Larry Levine was the engineer. In the United States the single peaked at number 6 and in the United Kingdom it peaked at number 2. It was The Crystals' third single to chart in the top ten in the United States, and their second to reach the top ten in the United Kingdom. The song was also a major hit in the Republic of Ireland, reaching number 3 in the charts there.

Cash Box described it as "a captivating, quick moving, full sounding romantic that sports a sensational arrangement by Jack 'Specs' Nitzsche."

Chart performance

Weekly charts

Year-end charts

The Beach Boys version

The song retitled "Then I Kissed Her" and released by The Beach Boys on their 1965 album Summer Days (And Summer Nights!!) with Al Jardine on lead vocals and production by Brian Wilson. Beyond title and gender changes, new lyrics were written retelling the story of the Crystals' song from the boyfriend's point of view.

Two years after appearing on the album, in April 1967 the song was released as a single in the United Kingdom, appearing as a stop-gap release while work continued on the "Heroes and Villains" single. This was reportedly done against the band's wishes; Beach Boys band member Mike Love commented on May 7, 1967 "The record company didn't even have the decency to put out one of Brian’s own compositions. The reason for the hold up with a new single has simply been that we wanted to give our public the best and the best isn't ready yet."

"Then I Kissed Her" charted at number 4 in the UK. The B-side of the single was "Mountain of Love", a song off the band's 1965 Beach Boys' Party! album.

Charts

According to contemporary national charts sourced and cited by Billboard in 1967, it reached number 2 in Sweden and South Africa and number 9 in Belgium. It was number 12 in Australia's Go Set chart and number 6 in New Zealand.

Personnel
Personnel sourced from Craig Slowinski.

The Beach Boys
Al Jardine – lead vocals
Bruce Johnston – Hammond B-3 organ, castanets
Mike Love – harmony and backing vocals
Brian Wilson – harmony and backing vocals, bass guitar, grand piano, timpani
Carl Wilson – harmony and backing vocals, electric and 12-string acoustic guitars
Dennis Wilson – drums

Session musicians and production staff
Ron Swallow – tambourine

Other versions
 British band Hello included a cover titled "Then She Kissed Me" on their 1976 debut album Keeps Us Off the Streets. The version appears in season 3, episode 1 of Sex Education.
 Kiss released a version, retitled "Then She Kissed Me", as the final track on their 1977 album Love Gun.
Iranian artist Afshin Moghaddam has performed a non-english cover of the song called "Asheghaneh".
 St. Vincent reimagined this as a sapphic love song as part of Legacy Records' Universal Love – Wedding Songs Reimagined
 Bruce Springsteen and the E Street Band performed a cover of the song to open their set at the Scottrade Center in St. Louis, Missouri, on 23 August 2008. This performance was later released as part of the official Bruce Springsteen Live Archive series.

References

Songs about kissing
1963 songs
1963 singles
1967 singles
1977 singles
Songs written by Ellie Greenwich
Songs written by Jeff Barry
Songs written by Phil Spector
Philles Records singles
The Crystals songs
Kiss (band) songs
Hep Stars songs
The Beach Boys songs
The Guess Who songs
Song recordings produced by Phil Spector
Song recordings with Wall of Sound arrangements
Song recordings produced by Brian Wilson
London Records singles
Capitol Records singles